Jessika Ponchet and Eden Silva were the defending champions but Ponchet chose to compete at the 2021 Internationaux Féminins de la Vienne instead. 

Silva partnered alongside Susan Bandecchi, but lost in the final to Irina Khromacheva and Arina Rodionova, 6–2, 3–6, [6–10].

Seeds

Draw

Draw

References
Main Draw

Torneig Internacional Els Gorchs - Doubles